A list of films produced in Brazil in 2008 (see 2008 in film):

2008

See also
2008 in Brazil
2008 in Brazilian television
List of 2008 box office number-one films in Brazil

2008
Films
Brazilian